Kritsada Kaman (born 18 March 1999) is a Thai professional footballer who plays as a defensive midfielder, he has also been used as a centre back for Thai League 1 club Chonburi and the Thailand national team.

Club career

Chonburi
Kritsada learned to play football in the youth team of the first division club Chonburi FC. The club from Chonburi played in the highest Thai league, the Thai League. It was here that he signed his first professional contract in 2015. From 2015 to 2016 he was loaned to third division Phanthong. In 2017 he returned to Chonburi after the loan.

International career
In November 2021, Kritsada was called up to the Thailand senior team for the first time by head coach Alexandré Pölking as one of the 30 players for the 2020 AFF Championship in Singapore. He made a debut for the team on 5 December 2021, playing the match for 90 minutes as a centre back in a 2–0 victory against Timor-Leste in the 2020 AFF Suzuki Cup group stage.

Personal life
Kritsada came from a Thai Muslim family from Trat. His nickname originates from the Arabic name Saleh.

Honours

Club
Chonburi
 Thai FA Cup runners-up (1): 2020–21

International
Thailand
 AFF Championship (2): 2020, 2022

Thailand U-19
 AFF U-19 Youth Championship (1): 2017

Individual
 FA Thailand Award
 Young player of the Year (1) : 2021–22
AFF Championship Best XI: 2022

References

External links
 

1999 births
Living people
Kritsada Kaman
Kritsada Kaman
Association football defenders
Kritsada Kaman
Kritsada Kaman
Kritsada Kaman
Kritsada Kaman
Competitors at the 2019 Southeast Asian Games
Kritsada Kaman
Kritsada Kaman
Kritsada Kaman
Kritsada Kaman